Sampath is a given name and surname. Sampath means prosperity in Hindu/Sanskrit and may also refer to:

 Gaali Sampath, 2021 Indian Telugu-language survival drama film
 Mavinakere Cheluvayyangar (1904–1983), Indian film actor better known by his stage name Sampath
 Mr. Sampath – The Printer of Malgudi, 1949 novel by R. K. Narayan
 Mr. Sampath (1972 film), Indian Tamil-language satirical film
 Onbathu Kuzhi Sampath, 2020 Indian Tamil-language romantic drama film
 Sampath Bank, Sri Lankan commercial bank